OFTA may refer to:

 Office of the Telecommunications Authority, part of the Telecommunications Authority in Hong Kong, dissolved in 2012
Oman–United States Free Trade Agreement, trade agreement signed in 2006